Anglo-Chinese School is a family of Methodist schools in Singapore, including:
 Anglo-Chinese School (Primary)
 Anglo-Chinese School (Junior)
 Anglo-Chinese School (Independent)
 Anglo-Chinese School (Barker Road)
 Anglo-Chinese School (International) Singapore
 Anglo-Chinese Junior College
ACS Jakarta in Indonesia

Anglo-Chinese School may also refer to:

 Anglo-Chinese Schools, Malaysia, several Methodist schools not affiliated with the Singapore schools, including:
 Anglo-Chinese School (Melaka) in Malacca
 Anglo Chinese School, Kampar in Kampar, Perak
 Anglo Chinese School, Sitiawan in Sitiawan, Manjung, Perak
 Anglo Chinese School, Klang in Klang, Selangor
 Anglo-Chinese School (1899 Philippine school) now Tiong Se Academy, in Manila

See also
 Ying Wa College or Anglo-Chinese College, founded in Malacca, Malaysia, now in Hong Kong